Zachary Lucas Hudgins (born December 12, 1968) is an American politician who served as a member of the Washington House of Representatives for the 11th Legislative District from 2003 to 2021. His District included Renton, Tukwila and South Seattle.

Early life and education
Born in Austin, Texas, Hudgins has a degree from the University of Notre Dame in Notre Dame, Indiana.

Career 
Prior to his career in politics, Hudgins worked at Amazon.com as a project manager and program manager with Microsoft. He has also worked as a campaign manager for various Democratic congressional candidates.

Politics
On November 1, 2011, Hudgins announced his candidacy for the office of the Secretary of State of Washington in the 2012 general election. On March 12, 2012, Hudgins withdrew from the race, focusing instead on running for an additional term representing the 11th District.

Zack Hudgins ran for the office of King County Director of Elections in 2015, losing to Julie Wise, the Deputy Director of the Department.

His committee assignments include Business & Financial Services, General Government Appropriations & Oversight (Chair) and Ways & Means. He is active in the Beacon Alliance of Neighbors and the SW King County Chamber of Commerce. He is also a member of the Greater Renton Chamber of Commerce and the Highlands Community Association. Hudgins has led seminars on democracy in the newly independent republics of Ukraine and Kyrgyzstan and in Iraq, with the National Democratic Institute.

References

External links
Personal website

1968 births
Living people
Amazon (company) people
University of Notre Dame alumni
Members of the Washington House of Representatives
Microsoft employees
21st-century American politicians
People from Tukwila, Washington